Jamie Benn (born 4 May 1977) is a Scottish former professional rugby league footballer, who played at representative level for Scotland, and at club level for the Castleford Tigers, York Wasps, Keighley Cougars, Dewsbury Rams, Featherstone Rovers and the Castleford Panthers, as an occasional goal-kicking  or .

After retiring as a player, Benn coached a number of teams at amateur level, including Oulton Raiders and Hunslet Warriors. He also coached the National Conference League (NCL) Eagles, with Jason Flowers as his assistant.

References

External links
 Statistics at rugbyleagueproject.org
 Statistics at thecastlefordtigers.co.uk

1977 births
Living people
Scottish rugby league players
Rugby league fullbacks
Rugby league wingers
Castleford Tigers players
York Wasps players
Keighley Cougars players
Dewsbury Rams players
Featherstone Rovers players
Place of birth missing (living people)
Rugby articles needing expert attention
Scotland national rugby league team players
Scottish rugby league coaches